Thomas Walter Dowling (March 8, 1940 – January 7, 2018) was an American college football coach and athletics administrator. He served as the head football coach at Georgetown College in Georgetown, Kentucky from 1973 to 1976, Liberty University in Lynchburg, Virginia from 1977 to 1983, and Cumberland College—now known as the University of the Cumberlands—in Williamsburg, Kentucky from 1995 to 2002, compiling a career head coaching record of 111–107–4. Dowling was the commissioner of the Mid-South Conference (MSC) from 1995 to 2002.

A graduate of Georgetown College, Dowling coached for over 30 years on the collegiate level. His coaching tree includes Mike Ayers of Wofford College. Both Ayers' son, Travis Dowling, and his grandson, Ezra Dowling, are named for Dowling.

Playing career
Dowling played football at Georgetown College, serving as co-captain of the 1960 team. He also won the [[River States ConferenceKentucky Intercollegiate Athletic Conference (KIAC) championship in the shot put while competing for the track team.

Coaching career
Dowling began his collegiate coaching career as an assistant at his alma mater, Georgetown College. After four seasons as Georgetown's head football coach, he became the third head football coach at Liberty Baptist College—now known as Liberty University. He led the Liberty Flames in their transition from National Association of Intercollegiate Athletics (NAIA) to NCAA Division II competition in 1981.

After Liberty, he moved on to start the football program at Cumberland College—now known as the University of the Cumberlands—Williamsburg, Kentucky.

Later life
Dowling later served as commissioner of the Mid-South Conference (MSC) from 1995 to 2002. He died of pancreatic cancer, on January 7, 2018.

Head coaching record

References

1940 births
2018 deaths
American male shot putters
Cumberlands Patriots football coaches
Georgetown Tigers football coaches
Georgetown Tigers football players
Liberty Flames football coaches
Mid-South Conference commissioners
College men's track and field athletes in the United States
People from Springfield, Kentucky
Coaches of American football from Kentucky
Players of American football from Kentucky
Track and field athletes from Kentucky
Deaths from cancer in Kentucky
Deaths from pancreatic cancer